Ahmed Mohamed Gulaid aka Ahmed Jimaleh was the first chairman of Somali National Movement (SNM). Gulaid belonged to the Sa'ad Muse sub-division of the Habr Awal Isaaq clan.

Somali National Movement (SNM)
Ahmed Mohamed Gulaid was the first to be elected as chairman of the SNM organization in October 1981.

Following a political conflict in SNM, Ahmed Mohamed Gulaid resigned from the position as chairman in January 1982.

References

1930 births
1992 deaths
20th-century Somalian people
Chairmen of the Somali National Movement
Somali National Movement
Somalian politicians